Benjamin Cole is the name of:

Benjamin Cole (instrument maker) (1695–1766), English surveyor, mapmaker, instrument maker, engraver and bookbinder
Benjamin Cole (mayor) (1919–1993), Puerto Rican mayor
Benjamin Cole House, historic house in Swansea, Massachusetts